This is a list of Dutch television related events from 1980.

Events
19 April - The 25th Eurovision Song Contest is held at the Congresgebouw in The Hague. Ireland wins the contest with the song "What's Another Year", performed by Johnny Logan.

Debuts

Television shows

1950s
NOS Journaal (1956–present)

1970s
Sesamstraat (1976–present)

Ending this year
Pipo de Clown (1958-1980)

Births
1 October - Kim-Lian van der Meij, actress, TV presenter & singer-songwriter

Deaths